Jack D. Wallace (December 11, 1925 – February 24, 1995) was an American football player and coach.  He served as the head football coach at Drake University from 1965 until 1976, compiling a record of 60–65–3.

Wallace was a native of Grants, New Mexico, and played college football at Pittsburg State University from 1946 to 1948.  He earned a master's degree from Drake and a Ph.D at the University of Iowa.  Wallace died on February 23, 1995, in an automobile accident near Corpus Christi, Texas.

Head coaching record

References

External links
 

1925 births
1995 deaths
Drake Bulldogs football coaches
Pittsburg State Gorillas football players
College golf coaches in the United States
Drake University alumni
University of Iowa alumni
People from Grants, New Mexico
Road incident deaths in Texas